The 1989 Vuelta a Andalucía was the 35th edition of the Vuelta a Andalucía cycle race and was held on 7 February to 12 February 1989. The race started in Málaga and finished in Granada. The race was won by Fabio Bordonali.

General classification

References

Vuelta a Andalucia
Vuelta a Andalucía by year
1989 in Spanish sport